Osmodes costatus, the black-veined white-spots, is a butterfly in the family Hesperiidae. It is found in Guinea, Sierra Leone, Ivory Coast, Ghana, Nigeria, Cameroon, Gabon, the Republic of the Congo, the Central African Republic, the Democratic Republic of the Congo, Uganda and north-western Tanzania. Its natural habitat consists of forests.

References

Butterflies described in 1896
Erionotini
Butterflies of Africa
Taxa named by Per Olof Christopher Aurivillius